Moradabad (also Romanized as Morādābād; also known as Ḩasanābād, Ḩasanābād-e Bālā, and Ḩasanābād-e Morādābād) is a village in Khaveh-ye Jonubi Rural District, in the Central District of Delfan County, Lorestan Province, Iran. At the 2006 census, its population was 62, in 15 families.

References 

Towns and villages in Delfan County